Erechim Airport  is the airport serving Erechim, Brazil.

It is operated by DAP.

History
In 2010, the entire airport complex received major investments, including renovation of the runway and of the terminal building.

Airlines and destinations

Access

See also

List of airports in Brazil

References

External links

Airports in Rio Grande do Sul